–

Benaouda Meflah, known by the nickname Aoued Meflah (May 7, 1906 – March 5, 1965) was an Algerian football player.

Aoued Meflah began playing football in French Algeria before moving to France to join amateur side SC Fives in 1929. He remained with SC Fives as the French league first implemented professionalism, scoring ten goals in the 1933–34 French Division 1 season.

References

External links
  Aoued Meflah statistics - Stade Rennais official website

1906 births
1965 deaths
People from Mascara, Algeria
Algerian footballers
French footballers
Algerian expatriate footballers
Algerian expatriate sportspeople in France
Expatriate footballers in France
Association football midfielders
GC Mascara players
MC Alger players
Stade Rennais F.C. players
Olympique Alès players
Olympique Antibes players
Ligue 1 players
Algerian football managers
SC Fives players